Intermission is a two-CD compilation album by Robert Forster and Grant McLennan, bandmates in The Go-Betweens, of material recorded for their solo albums through the 1990s.

Although the album was released after the death of McLennan in May 2006, it had been planned since 2000 and a final track list prepared in April 2006. The album title was chosen by McLennan.

Forster, in a 2007 interview, explained: "Grant and I had always planned to take last year off. Our last album Oceans Apart did so well, Intermission was intended to give new fans something to look into and to tide old fans over. When Grant died, I froze. I didn't know what to do about music. Everyone left me alone to decide in my own time and, at the end of 2006, I felt the best thing to do was to carry on as we'd planned; finish sorting Intermission."

He said the album had always been planned as two separate discs, each presenting their own work: "We enjoyed those years of exploring our songs apart, they helped us grow. They don't sound like The Go-Betweens, and to force them together retrospectively wouldn't be right."

The recordings were
re-mastered by Bill Inglot and longtime manager Bob Johnson.

Track listing

Robert Forster
(All songs written by Robert Forster except where marked)
 "Falling Star" – 4:05
Recorded Brisbane, October 1992. Originally on Calling From a Country Phone
"Baby Stones" – 4:06
Recorded Berlin, June/July 1990. Originally on Danger in the Past
"121" – 3:29
Recorded Brisbane, October 1992. Originally on Calling From a Country Phone
"I've Been Looking For Somebody" – 4:20
Recorded Berlin, June/July 1990. Originally on Danger in the Past
"I'll Jump" – 3:02
Recorded London, January/February 1996. Originally on Warm Nights
"Beyond Their Law" – 5:03
Recorded Brisbane, October 1992. Originally on Calling From a Country Phone
"I Can Do" – 3:00
Recorded London, January/February 1996. Originally on Warm Nights
"The Circle" – 3:44
Recorded Brisbane, October 1992. Originally on Calling From a Country Phone
"Cryin' Love" – 5:26
Recorded London, January/February 1996. Originally on Warm Nights
"The River People" – 3:26
Recorded Berlin, June/July 1990. Originally on Danger in the Past
"Frisco Depot" (Mickey Newbury) – 2:38
Recorded Melbourne, January 1994.  Originally on I Had a New York Girlfriend
"Danger in The Past" – 4:51
Recorded Berlin, June/July 1990. Originally on Danger in the Past
"Falling Star (Original Version)" – 4:04
Recorded Berlin, June/July 1990.

Grant McLennan
(All songs by Grant McLennan)
"Haven't I Been A Fool" – 3:23
Recorded Sydney, September/October 1990. Originally on Watershed
"Easy Come Easy Go" – 4:01
Recorded Sydney, September/October 1990. Originally on Watershed
"Black Mule" – 4:45
Recorded Sydney, September/October 1990. Originally on Watershed
"The Dark Side Of Town" – 3:45
Recorded Sydney and Melbourne, 1993. Originally on Fireboy
"Lighting Fires" – 3:36
Recorded Sydney and Melbourne, 1993. Originally on Fireboy
"Surround Me" – 3:55
Recorded Sydney and Melbourne, 1993. Originally on Fireboy
"No Peace In The Palace" – 4:16
Recorded Athens, Georgia, 1994. Originally on Horsebreaker Star
"Hot Water" – 3:48
Recorded Athens, Georgia, 1994. Originally on Horsebreaker Star
"I'll Call You Wild" – 4:42
Recorded Athens, Georgia, 1994. Originally on Horsebreaker Star
"Horsebreaker Star" – 4:15
Recorded Athens, Georgia, 1994. Originally on Horsebreaker Star
"Malibu 69" – 4:46
Recorded Sydney, December 1996/January 1997. Originally on In Your Bright Ray
"One Plus One" – 2:59
Recorded Sydney, December 1996/January 1997. Originally on In Your Bright Ray
"In Your Bright Ray" – 4:57
Recorded Sydney, December 1996/January 1997. Originally on In Your Bright Ray

References

Grant McLennan albums
Robert Forster (musician) albums
The Go-Betweens albums
2007 compilation albums
Albums produced by John Keane (record producer)
Beggars Banquet Records compilation albums